Tauhara College is a state coeducational secondary school located in Taupo, New Zealand. Serving Years 9 to 13, the school has approximately 600 students.

Tauhara College is one of three high schools in Taupo; the others are Taupo-nui-a-Tia College and Lake Taupo Christian School (state integrated).

Waka
The students in the school are divided into four waka ("canoes") which compete in numerous events, mostly sporting, throughout the year in order to gain the most points in the Tauhara College Canoe Competition. The houses, and the colours they are represented by, are:

Aotea (blue)
Arawa (green)
Mataatua (red)
Tainui (yellow)

Notable alumni
 Donovan Bixley - illustrator, author of Faithfully Mozart
 Bevan Docherty - Triathlete, Olympic silver medalist
 Te Ururoa Flavell - Minister of Maori Development; leader of the Maori Party; former Head of Maori Studies
 Carly Flynn - journalist, presenter of Sunrise
 Bevan Graham - Chief Economist, AMP NZ
 Melina Hamilton - pole vaulter, Olympian
 Todd McClay - Member of Parliament for Rotorua; former Cook Islands diplomat (Ambassador to European Union)
 Dion Waller -  former New Zealand All Black

Notes

External links
 Tauhara College
 TKI School Information: Tauhara College

Educational institutions established in 1975
Secondary schools in Waikato
Taupō
Schools in the Taupo District